Edward Heyward Kritzler (died 2010) was a Jamaican popular historian, specializing in the Sephardic diaspora in the wake of the expulsion of the Jews from Spain, and the Jewish identity continuity in the "New World", Amsterdam, the Maghreb, and Ottoman eastern Mediterranean.

Published works
  Reprint of 1st edition, Doubleday (2008)

References
 
 
 
 

Historians of Jews and Judaism
2010 deaths
Year of birth missing